Denise Faye Greenbaum is an American actress, dancer, choreographer, and director. She is the recipient of an American Choreography Award, as well as a Screen Actor's Guild Award for the 2002 film Chicago. Faye won the Dance Track Magazine Artist Award for best choreography in a feature film for her work in Burlesque. Additionally, she received nominations including the Fred and Adele Astaire Award and The World Dance Awards for her choreography in Burlesque.

Career
In 2014, Faye co-directed and choreographed much of Cher Dressed to Kill tour.  Later she directed the concert DVD of Martha Davis & the Motels Live at the Whisky a Go Go's 50th Anniversary, released in the summer of 2015. Next she directed a music video for Martha Davis and the Motels.

Faye directed the staged reading of the musical The Magic Horn, written by Charlie Midnight, James Marr and Wendy Piggot at The Geffen Playhouse in Los Angeles, which was being developed for the Broadway stage.

Faye's choreography includes working with Hugh Jackman on a multimillion-dollar live extravaganza for Steve Wynn, Jennifer Aniston's strip tease in We're the Millers, and re-staging/choreographing Catherine Zeta-Jones in All That Jazz for the 85th Annual Academy Awards.

Among her many Broadway credits are Chicago, Guys and Dolls and Jerome Robbins Broadway. Plays include works at the Public Theater, Lincoln Center Theater, Williamstown Theater Festival and Second Stage Theater.

Her choreography can be seen in such films as My Week with Marilyn, We're the Millers, Burlesque, and working alongside her mentor, Rob Marshall, in the Academy Award–winning Chicago, and Nine, among others. In television, she has choreographed and directed segments on shows such as The American Music Awards, Dancing with the Stars, and The X Factor UK. Additionally, she has choreographed many television commercials including GoDaddy for the 2012 Super Bowl and Dasani Water for the 2012 Summer Olympics.

Prior to this, Faye trained at the School of American Ballet, danced with the New York City Ballet and then attended Barnard College with a double major in Urban Studies and Psychology. She has also danced in the Jon Bon Jovi music video "Queen of New Orleans", which was the first single from Jon's solo album Destination Anywhere.

Projects
 Magic Horn – Broadway musical in development: Director/Producer
 Cher's Dressed to Kill tour
 Martha Davis and the Motels – Video: Director
 Steve Wynn birthday extravaganza starring Hugh Jackman – 2014
 Fred and Adele Astaire Awards – Choreographed "All That Jazz" featuring Catherine Zeta-Jones – 2013
 We're the Millers – Film: Choreographed Jennifer Aniston's strip tease, Rawson Marshall Thurber director – 2013
 Kirstie – TV: Choreographer – Kirstie Alley and Michael Richards – 2013
 The Academy Awards – TV: Restaged/Choreographed All That Jazz featuring Catherine Zeta-Jones – 2013
 My Week with Marilyn – Film: Choreographed and Directed Michelle Williams musical numbers – 2011
 Pirates of the Caribbean 4 – Film: Associate Choreographer, Rob Marshall director, John DeLuca choreographer – Johnny Depp, Penélope Cruz – 2011
 Burlesque – Film: Choreographer, Steven Antin director – Cher, Christina Aguilera – 2010
 The American Music Awards – TV: Director/Choreographer of Musical Segment – 2010
 X Factor UK-series finale – TV: Director/Choreographer of Musical Segment – 2010
 Dancing with the Stars – TV: Director/Choreographer of Musical Segment – 2010
 Castle: Choreographer – 2011
 Saving Grace – TV: Choreographer – Holly Hunter – 2009
 Nine – Film: Associate Choreographer, Rob Marshall director/co-choreographer with John DeLuca – Daniel Day-Lewis, Nicole Kidman, Marianne Cotilliard, Penélope Cruz – 2009
 The 59th Primetime Emmy Awards – TV: Associate Choreographer, Rob Marshall/John DeLuca choreographer – 2007
 Tony Bennett: An American Classic – TV: Associate Choreographer, Rob Marshall director/co-choreographer with John DeLuca – Tony Bennett, Barbra Streisand, Christina Aguilera – 2006
 Memoirs of a Geisha – Film: Associate Choreographer, Rob Marshall director, John DeLuca choreographer – Gong Li, Zhang Ziyi – 2005
 Stuart Little Three – Video: Choreographer – 2005
 The 75th Annual Academy Awards – TV: Associate Choreographer, Rob Marshall/John DeLuca choreographers – 2003
 Chicago – Film: Associate Choreographer, Rob Marshall director/choreographer – Renee Zellweger, Richard Gere, Catherine Zeta-Jones – 2002
 Annie – Disney TV Movie: Associate Choreographer, Rob Marshall director/choreographer – Alan Cumming, Kristin Chenoweth, Victor Garber – 1999

Filmography

Stage credits

Awards and nominations

References

External links 
 
 

Actresses from New York City
American choreographers
American female dancers
Dancers from New York (state)
American film actresses
American stage actresses
Barnard College alumni
Living people
Outstanding Performance by a Cast in a Motion Picture Screen Actors Guild Award winners
Year of birth missing (living people)
21st-century American women